The Software Industry Survey is an annual, for-the-public scientific survey about the size, composition, current state and future of the software industry and companies in Europe with origin in Finland.

The survey organization is led (in 2010 and 2011) by the Software Business Lab research group of the BIT research centre at Aalto University, School of Science and Technology (former Helsinki University of Technology) with the help of several industry partners. Researchers from the Helsinki University of Technology and Centres of Expertise first organized this survey in 1997 to provide an overview of the Finnish software industry with financing mainly from the National Technology Agency (Tekes) and the Finnish Ministry of Trade and Industry. The 2011 Finnish survey received responses from 506 participants which is a bit smaller than 2010 due to more strict selection criteria. Surveys analysing the industry in other European countries than Finland are run by research partners. In 2011 the survey was implemented in Austria and Germany.

The published reports by the survey group cover current economic impacts on the software industry (like the crises in 2009/2010 or Nokia’s changes for its mobile platform in 2011) on roughly 100 pages. Starting with the 2009 report, all included images and tables can be re-used under the free Creative Commons Attribution license version 3.0.

Apart from these reports, the survey's data is used as input for various scientific studies based on the collected data. Results are also used by media companies like newspapers as source for news articles.

References

External links 
 softwareindustrysurvey.fi/ – the Software Industry Survey group's website in Finland

Surveys (human research)
Software industry